Paladilhia is a genus of minute freshwater snails with an operculum, aquatic gastropod molluscs or micromolluscs in the family Moitessieriidae.

Species
Species within the genus Paladilhia include:
 Paladilhia bourguignati Locard, 1883
 Paladilhia castaneaensis Girardi, 2015
 Paladilhia conica Paladilhe, 1867
 Paladilhia coutalensis Girardi, 2015
 Paladilhia gloeeri Boeters & Falkner, 2003
 Paladilhia hungarica Soos, 1927
 Paladilhia jamblussensis Bertrand, 2004
 † Paladilhia liaoheensis Youluo, 1978 
 Paladilhia moitessieri Bourguignat, 1865
 Paladilhia pleurotoma Bourguignat, 1865
 † Paladilhia plicistriaCossmann, 1888) 
 Paladilhia roselloi Girardi, 2004
 † Paladilhia sinensis Youluo, 1978 
 Paladilhia subconica Girardi, 2009
 Paladilhia umbilicata (Locard, 1902)
 Paladilhia vernierensis Girardi, 2009
 Paladilhia yunnanensis Liu, Wang & Zhang, 1980
Species brought into synonymy
 Paladilhia bessoni Bernasconi, 1999: synonym of Palaospeum bessoni (Bernasconi, 1999)
 Paladilhia bourguignati Paladilhe, 1866: synonym of Bythiospeum bourguignati (Paladilhe, 1866) (original combination)
 Paladilhia carpathica L. Soós, 1940: synonym of Paladilhiopsis carpathica (L. Soós, 1940) (basionym)
 Paladilhia oshanovae L. Pintér, 1968: synonym of Bythiospeum oshanovae (L. Pintér, 1968) (original combination)
 Paladilhia pontmartiniana (Nicolas, 1891): synonym of Paladilhia pleurotoma Bourguignat, 1865
 Paladilhia robiciana Clessin, 1882: synonym of Paladilhiopsis robiciana (Clessin, 1882)
 Paladilhia vobarnensis Pezzoli & Toffoletto, 1968: synonym of Iglica vobarnensis (Pezzoli & Toffoletto, 1968) (basionym)

References

 Bourguignat, J.-R. (1865). Monographie du nouveau genre français Paladilhia. 1-21 pp, 1 pl. Paris (F. Savy).
 Youluo. (1978). Early Tertiary gastropod fossils from the coastal region of Bohai. Paleontological and Geological Research Institute, Nanjing. vi + 157 pp., 33 pls.
Paladilhia castaneaensis, nouvelle espèce stygobie de la grotte des Châtaigniers à Saint-Martin-de-Londres, Hérault, France. Comparaison avec les autres espèces du genre Paladilhia Bourguignat 1865, du secteur héraultais. Avenionia 1: 21-29

External links
 Cossmann, M. (1921). Essais de paléoconchologie comparée. Douzième livraison. Paris: [the author]. 349 pp., plates A-D, 1-6

Moitessieriidae
Taxonomy articles created by Polbot